The Beijing–Ürümqi Expressway, designated as G7 and commonly referred to as the Jingxin Expressway is an expressway that connects the cities of Beijing, China, and Ürümqi, Xinjiang. It is noted for being the world's longest desert highway, passing through several deserts part of the Gobi Desert, such as the Ulan Buh Desert, the Tengger Desert and the Badain Jaran Desert.

Detailed itinerary

References

07
Expressways in Beijing
Expressways in Hebei
Expressways in Inner Mongolia
Expressways in Gansu
Expressways in Xinjiang